

Anthropology

Arts & Culture

Biography

Business & Economy

Fiction, Poetry & Humour - Malaysian Authors

Fiction - Set in Malaysia - Non-Malaysian Authors

Science, Geography, Nature

History

General History - Summaries

Ancient History

Pre-Colonial History

Colonial History - Borneo

Colonial History - Malaya & Singapore

World War 2 History

Post-War Modern History

Politics & Law

Travel & Tourism

References 

Malaysia-related lists
Malaysia